This is a list of Turkish provinces by GDP and GDP per capita.

List of Provinces by GDP 
Provinces by GDP in 2017 according to data by the Turkish Statistical Institute.

List of Provinces by GDP per capita 
Provinces by GDP per capita in 2017 according to data by the Turkish Statistical Institute.

See also 
Economy of Turkey
List of Turkish regions by Human Development Index

References 

 GDP
Provinces by GDP
Gross state product
Ranked lists of country subdivisions